Svetlana Kuznetsova was the defending champion, however she was unable to defend her title due to visa issues.

Jessica Pegula won her first WTA title, defeating Camila Giorgi in the final, 6–2, 6–2.

Seeds

Draw

Finals

Top half

Bottom half

Qualifying

Seeds

Qualifiers

Draw

First qualifier

Second qualifier

Third qualifier

Fourth qualifier

References

External Links
Main Draw
Qualifying Draw

Citi Open - Women's Singles